Tetilla is a genus of flowering plants. It belongs to the family Francoaceae, which is sometimes included as part of the family Melianthaceae. It has historically been included in the Saxifragaceae. 

It is a monotypic genus, containing only one species, Tetilla hydrocotylifolia. It is endemic to Chile.

References

Francoaceae
Monotypic Geraniales genera
Endemic flora of Chile